Demolition Day is former Queens of the Stone Age and Kyuss bassist/vocalist Nick Oliveri's first solo acoustic album.  The album was recorded in 2003 and 2004 at Dave Grohl's Studio 606. The album features Oliveri on bass, vocals, guitars and percussion, as well as horns and guitars from other various artists. It was released in 2004 on vinyl only, but a split CD featuring six tracks from the album and four tracks from Mondo Generator was also released.

Track listing

Split CD
Nick Oliveri
 All I've Got (Nick Oliveri)
 I Want You to Die (Nick Oliveri)
 Autopilot (Nick Oliveri/Josh Homme)
 Simple Exploding Man (Nick Oliveri)
 One More Time in Hell (Nick Oliveri)
 Paper Thin (Nick Oliveri)

Mondo Generator
 All the Way Down (Nick Oliveri)
 Bloody Hammer (Roky Erikson)
 There She Goes Again (Nick Oliveri)
 Sleep the Lie Away (Nick Oliveri/Dave Catching)

Vinyl
 Intro
 All I've Got
 I Want You To Die
 Demolition Day
 Chiefs
 Autopilot
 Simple Exploding Man
 One More Time In Hell
 Four Corners
 Tornadoes
 So High So Low
 Ode To Clarissa
 Wake Up Screaming
 Detroit
 Paper Thin

Trivia
 "I Want You to Die" is an acoustic version of the song from Mondo Generator's album Cocaine Rodeo.
 "Autopilot" is an acoustic version of Queens of the Stone Age's Rated R song and features Mark Lanegan on backing vocals.
 "Simple Exploding Man" is an acoustic version of the song from Mondo Generator's Cocaine Rodeo.
 "Four Corners" is from Mondo Generator's previous album A Drug Problem That Never Existed and features Mark Lanegan on vocals.
 "Paper Thin" was rerecorded for Mondo Generator's next album Dead Planet: SonicSlowMotionTrails.
 "Ode To Clarissa" is a new recording from a Queens of the Stone Age B-Side circa Rated R.
 "So High, So Low" is a new recording from Mondo Generator's album A Drug Problem That Never Existed and was rerecorded for Dead Planet: SonicSlowMotionTrails.
 "All I've Got" was rerecorded for Mondo Generator's next album Dead Planet: SonicSlowMotionTrails and was retitled "Take Me Away" .
 CD Tracks 7-10 is actually all four tracks from III the EP.

References 

2004 albums
Nick Oliveri albums
Mondo Generator albums